Kubicki (feminine: Kubicka; plural: Kubiccy) is a Polish locational surname, which originally meant a person from Kubice in Poland. Alternative spellings include Czech and Slovak Kubický and a Germanized variant, Kubitzki.

People 
Dariusz Kubicki (born 1963), Polish footballer and manager
Eugeniusz Kubicki (born 1925), Polish footballer
Ewa Kubicka, Polish mathematician
Hanna Foltyn-Kubicka (born 1950), Polish politician 
Jakub Kubicki (1758–1833), Polish architect
Janusz Kubicki (born 1969), Polish politician
Jarosław Kubicki (born 1995), Polish footballer
Klaus Kubitzki (born 1933), German botanist
Patryk Kubicki (born 1993), Polish footballer
Philip Kubicki (born 1943), American businessman
Terry Kubicka (born 1956), American figure skater
Werner Kubitzki (1915–1994), German field hockey player
Wolfgang Kubicki (born 1952), German politician

See also
Kubicek (disambiguation)
Kubitschek (disambiguation)

References

Polish-language surnames